Big Brother Australia 13, also known as Big Brother 2021, is the thirteenth season of the Australian reality television series Big Brother. It began airing on 26 April 2021 on Seven Network. Sonia Kruger returned as host of the series. The concept for this season is More Than Meets The Eye.

This season revolved around strangers living in a house together with no communication with the outside world as they competed for $250,000. They were constantly filmed during their time in the house and were not permitted to communicate with those filming them. Over the course of the competition, housemates will compete in challenges for power and safety before voting each other out of the house. When three housemates remain, the Australian public decided which finalist would win the grand prize.

The series was filmed from October to December 2020 and aired from April to late June in the following year on Seven Network. The live finale was aired on 29 June 2021, where Marley Biyendolo was declared the winner and won a prize of $250,000 with Christina Podolyan and Sarah Jane "SJ" Adams being declared as the Runners-up. In addition, Biyendolo also won a prize of $10,000 after winning the challenge on Episode 26.

Production
In June 2020, during the release of the twelfth season, it was announced that Big Brother Australia had been renewed for a thirteenth season set to air in 2021. As in the previous season, the show was pre-recorded and was filmed between October and December 2020. On 11 April Seven announced that the season would premiere on 26 April.

International broadcast
The season was broadcast in New Zealand online-only, via TVNZ OnDemand, starting 4 May 2021 with the first four episodes and each subsequent episodes being released within 48 hours of the Australian broadcast. This marked the return of the show to TVNZ after a 16-year absence following the conclusion of the 2005 season.

Impact of the COVID-19 pandemic 

The live finale was impacted by the on-going pandemic, as the plan was to broadcast from Hordern Pavilion at Fox Studios in Randwick in front of an audience of 2,000 people with all 26 housemates in attendance. As the result of lockdowns announced on June 24, 2021, it was confirmed the following day that no audience would be in attendance for the finale. In addition, due to inter-state travel restrictions nine housemates opted to appear via video link despite an initial desire from Endemol Shine Australia to still have everyone appear in-person. Lillian Ahenkan, the second evictee of the series, did not participate in the finale as she was given the option to not attend in-person due to the lockdowns - but did not appear via video link like other housemates that were unable to attend in-person.

Housemates
On 14 March 2021, Channel Seven revealed Sarah Jane Adams as the first housemate for the series. More housemates were revealed over the following weeks, with the full cast of the 20 original Housemates being introduced on 25 April. Among the Intruders, Brenton was revealed in pre-show material, whilst the other 5 intruders were revealed on 15 May, a few days before their introduction on the show on Episode 12.

Two pre-existing relationships were a part of the game in a minor twist: Max and Katie are ex-boyfriend and girlfriend and intruders Alex and Charlotte M are twin sisters. Other than the personal effects of their relationships, there was no direct effect on the mechanics of the game.

Future Appearances 
Daniel Hayes competed in Big Brother: VIP. He was the fourth housemate to be evicted from the house. In 2022, Marley Biyendolo competed on The Challenge: Australia.

Episodes

Voting history

 This housemate was nominated for eviction.
 This housemate won the Challenge on this round. 
 This housemate was immune from this round of eviction.
 This housemate was not in the Main House and did not participate in this round of eviction.
 This housemate was originally nominated but was saved from eviction.

 
Notes

Ratings
Ratings data is from OzTAM and represents the viewership from the 5 largest Australian metropolitan centres (Sydney, Melbourne, Brisbane, Perth and Adelaide).

Controversy

Alleged game rigging from production
This season of Big Brother has several alleged instances of the production team favouring game events for particular Housemates, including Daniel. One alleged incident is that of the Panic Room task in Episode 19. The alleged incident reported that Daniel wanted to enter the room early in the task, before being asked to go to the Diary Room. After the Diary Room visit, Daniel requested to go last (the position that would be awarded a secret game power).

References

External links 

2021 Australian television seasons
13